Outrageous 911 is an American reality television series that premiered on the TLC cable network, on December 14, 2013. The series features some of the strangest and oddest calls to police during mishaps and accidents.

Episodes

References

External links
 

2010s American reality television series
2013 American television series debuts
English-language television shows
TLC (TV network) original programming